Gárdony is a town in Fejér county, Hungary.

This town is next to Lake Velencei and is a popular summer destination. The town is divided into three parts: Gárdony, Agárd and Dinnyés and lies on the south shore of the lake. The name Gárdony is believed to have originated in the early 13th century. There is at least one known writing dating back to 1260 that referred to Gardun, King of Zsigmond (1387-1437).

On 31 March 1989 Gárdony changed its status from village to town.

In the summertime thousands of tourists visit the lake. In fact, several new resorts have recently opened on the shore of the lake. The lake is known as a great destination to bring the family. Tourists, who like water sports such as boating, swimming, sailing and fishing enjoy the lake. On the shore, there are facilities for volleyball, basketball, tennis, and football.   Additionally, there is live entertainment planned throughout the summer months.

Géza Gárdonyi was born in Gárdony. He was born in Agárdpuszta and a statue of him is located centre park of Agárd. Agárd has a reformed church, Saint Ann Chapel, which is a Catholic church of Dinnyés and was built in a Baroque style. Budapest, the capital of Hungary is only fifty-five kilometres from Gárdony.

Twin towns – sister cities

Gárdony is twinned with:

 Gieboldehausen, Germany 
 Kirchbach, Austria
 Lesquin, France
 Mörlenbach, Germany
 Postbauer-Heng, Germany
 Salo, Finland
 Valea Crișului, Romania
 Żary, Poland

Sport
The association football club, Gárdonyi VSC, is based in the town.

Gallery

See also 
Csiribpuszta
Agárd

External links

  in Hungarian
 Gárdony.lap.hu - Link directory – Startlap 
 Gárdony at funiq.hu 
https://www.telepules.com/en/gardony/tourism.html ?

References 



Populated places in Fejér County
Spa towns in Hungary